Walkinshaw Performance is an automotive company involved in motor racing and the production of high performance sporting cars for regular road use. The company was founded by former racing driver, Scottish businessman, Tom Walkinshaw and is essentially a successor organisation to his previous automotive concern, Tom Walkinshaw Racing which was driven into bankruptcy by the failure of the Arrows Formula One team, then a part of TWR. Walkinshaw Performance is now operated by Walkinshaw's son, Ryan.

Holden
In 2005 Walkinshaw was making his return to his involvement in Australian automotive industry initially through Holden Special Vehicles. In addition to HSV, Walkinshaw Performance also took over the construction and maintenance of racing cars for Holden Racing Team (HRT) and the HSV Dealer Team. After purchasing Elfin Sports Cars the low volume, high performance sports car maker was added to Walkinshaw Performance in 2006 and slowly revitalised its Holden based designs. 2007 saw partial ownership of Holden Racing Team return to Walkinshaw Performance. WP's involvement with HSV Dealer Team ceased when the Kelly family took their Racing Entitlements Contracts and set-up Kelly Racing at the end of 2008 after purchasing much of Perkins Engineering. At the same time WP acquired the rest of HRT from Skaife Sports and Dillon Racing to set up a new two car team titled Walkinshaw Racing which began operation at the start of 2009.

In addition to the vehicle construction businesses, Walkinshaw Performance also builds add-on performance parts for vehicles based on the Holden Commodore platform in the guises of Holdens, HSVs, Pontiacs and Vauxhalls, as well as performance parts for Hummers.

In August 2016, Holden announced it would consolidate its sponsorship of the Supercars Championship at Triple Eight Race Engineering. This saw HRT brand transfer to Triple Eight Race Engineering in 2017 with the two HRT cars entered under a revived Walkinshaw Racing brand.

4WD and Truck Market
With the closing of Holden in Australia, and the Walkinshaw Group subsequently becoming heavily involved with the conversion of LHD to RHD of large American trucks such as Silverado, as well as various re-engineering projects for other vehicle manufacturing companies, Walkinshaw Performance also turned their skills to the 4x4 market.
Working on models such as Silverado, RAM DS and VW Amarok, they have produced superchargers, headers, cat & lifts, as well as towing accessories. Walkinshaw Performance have also tested their skills in 2022 by entering 2 vehicles in the AORC events.

W-Series models
The model number refers to power in kW
W375
W407
W457
W497
W507
W547
W557

References

Australian racecar constructors
Auto parts suppliers of Australia